Batalha dos Confeiteiros (English: Battle of the Bakers) is a Brazilian television series based on Next Great Baker, hosted by Buddy Valastro, the star of his own reality series, Cake Boss. The series premiered Wednesday, 30 September 2015 at 10:30 p.m. on RecordTV.

The show features contestants participating in challenges that test their edible art baking and decorating skills. Each week, a contestant will be eliminated; the last contestant standing will win a grand prize package that varies by season. Other prizes for winning a challenge or the week's competition are also offered during the series.

Gameplay
Each round has three stages: 
 Baker's challenge: Each contestant has to meet a challenge set by Buddy the Cake Boss, such as making a pastry, baking a cake or, as in the first season finale, filling buckets of grease. The winner of this challenge receives a special bonus, revealed after the challenge.
 Elimination challenge: Each contestant has a set amount of time over two days — usually three hours on the first day and the remaining time on the second — to make a cake to specifications set by Buddy.
 Final elimination: Buddy and the judges (the judge from the Baker's challenge and a client) decide which three cakes are the best and which two cakes that are the worst. After the decisions are made, the contestants (who were waiting in the bakers' lounge) enter the judging room. Contestants determined "safe" are then dismissed. Then, the three contestants with the best cakes are announced, with the one with the best cake in the challenge singled out. The remaining contestants have the worst cakes in the challenge; one of these will be told to leave the competition, transported away by Danny (an employee of Carlo's Bakery and Buddy's close friend) inside a box truck marked "Not the Next Great Baker".

Contestants
Fourteen contestants competed during the series:

Contestant progress

Key

Ratings and reception

Brazilian ratings
All numbers are in points and provided by IBOPE.

References

External links
 Batalha dos Confeiteiros on R7.com
 

2015 Brazilian television series debuts
Brazilian reality television series
Television shows filmed in São Paulo (state)
Food reality television series
Media about cakes
 
Reality television spin-offs